Vladimir Aleksandrovich Kocharyan (June 10, 1950 in Leninakan – June 10, 1989 in Yerevan) was an Armenian Film Actor. He was born in Leninakan and studied at Directing Department of Yerevan Fine Arts and Theatre Institute from 1973 to 76. Kocharyan performed and directed in Leninakan Drama Theatre between 1973–76 and performed in the Sundukyan Drama Theatre of Yerevan from 1977 to 1980. In 1984, he received the honorary title of "People's Artist of the Armenian SSR". His wife, Karine Kocharyan (née, Sukiasyan) is also an actress. He died at the age of 39.

Filmography  
1978 - Exile 011 
1978 - Neutral Situation 
1980 - The Eighth Day of Creation, short
1981 - Lyrical March
1982 - Cry of a Peacock
1983 - A Burning Lantern 
1983 - Fire Sparkling in the Night 
1984 - An Expected Rider
1986 - A Lonely Nut-Tree 
1987 - The Thirteenth Apostle 
1989 - Facing the Wall 
1989 - Repeated Be All...
1993 - P.S

References

External links

Armenian male film actors
People from Gyumri
1950 births
1989 deaths
20th-century Armenian male actors